In Greek mythology, Amaleus is the name of the oldest of the Niobids, the twelve or fourteen children of Amphion, king of Thebes, by his wife Queen Niobe. Although the Niobids are primarily notable for the myth of Niobe's blasphemous boast against the goddess Leto, Amaleus has a unique appearance of his own in myth, where an attempt on his life was made by his aunt, Aëdon.

Etymology 
The ancient Greek  might be connected to Greek , meaning 'soft'. A son of Amphion named  appears as an eponym on a scholium on Euripides.

Mythology

Aëdon 
Amaleus had many siblings and only one cousin, Itylus, the son of his uncle Zethus by his wife, Aëdon. All the Niobids but especially Amaleus got along greatly with cousin Itylus; the two boys slept together in the same room and, in some accounts, bed. However Aëdon deeply resented Niobe for having borne so many children while she only had one, so she conceived a plan to kill Amaleus, who was the firstborn child. She instructed Itylus to sleep in the back of the room, or in the innermost position of the bed that night, but Itylus forgot about his mother's orders. So that night when Aëdon crept up into the room wielding a dagger and planning to murder Amaleus, she ended up killing her own child Itylus instead.

Niobe's boast 
Amaleus's mother Niobe was exceedingly proud of the vast progeny she had produced for her husband. In the most known narrative concerning Niobe and her children, she boasted of being a greater mother than the goddess Leto, for she had many children, while Leto only had two. Leto informed her two children, the archer gods Artemis and Apollo, and they took the matter in their own hands; they slew all the Niobids. It was said that the boys, whom Apollo slew, were killed while they were hunting in the woods. Their father, Amphion, committed suicide at the sight of the lifeless bodies of his sons, or was slain by Apollo while storming his temple in protest. Niobe herself would be transformed into rock following the slaying of the daughters. In a rarer version, Niobe's father, named Asson instead, fell in love with Niobe, but she would not yield to his incestuous embraces, so he invited all her children to a banquet and burnt them all to death in revenge.

See also 

 Cassiopeia
 Telephus and Auge
 Itys

References

Bibliography 

 Apollodorus, Apollodorus, The Library, with an English Translation by Sir James George Frazer, F.B.A., F.R.S. in 2 Volumes. Cambridge, MA, Harvard University Press; London, William Heinemann Ltd. 1921. Online version at the Perseus Digital Library.
  Online version at Internet Archive.
 
 
 
 
 
 Homer, The Iliad with an English Translation by A.T. Murray, PhD in two volumes. Cambridge, MA., Harvard University Press; London, William Heinemann, Ltd. 1924. Online version at the Perseus Digital Library.
 Hyginus, Gaius Julius, The Myths of Hyginus. Edited and translated by Mary A. Grant, Lawrence: University of Kansas Press, 1960.
 
 Ovid, Metamorphoses, Brookes More, Boston, Cornhill Publishing Co. 1922. Online version at the Perseus Digital Library.
 
 Pausanias, Pausanias Description of Greece with an English Translation by W.H.S. Jones, Litt.D., and H.A. Ormerod, M.A., in 4 Volumes. Cambridge, MA, Harvard University Press; London, William Heinemann Ltd. 1918. Online version at the Perseus Digital Library.
 
 

Niobids
Theban characters in Greek mythology
Deeds of Apollo
Deeds of Artemis
Princes in Greek mythology